John Henry "Jack" Addenbrooke (6 June 1865 – 7 September 1922) was an English football player and manager, who spent his career with Wolverhampton Wanderers.

Career
Addenbrooke was one of the founding members of Wolverhampton Wanderers (as St. Lukes F.C.) in 1877 while working as a teacher at St. Luke's School in Blakenhall. He moved to Saltley College in Birmingham, but in 1883 joined Wolves as a player, playing as a forward in their reserve side, but never making a first team appearance.

In August 1885 he was appointed as Wolves' first-ever paid secretary-manager, guiding the side to FA Cup wins in 1893 and 1908 and runners-up in 1889, 1896 and 1921. He was awarded an English Football League long-service medal in 1909.

He took leave from the club in June 1922 due to ill health and died just months later. His 37-year term as manager of Wolves remains the longest in club history.

References
 

1865 births
1922 deaths
Footballers from Wolverhampton
English footballers
Wolverhampton Wanderers F.C. players
English football managers
Wolverhampton Wanderers F.C. managers
Association football forwards